Al Khalidi Medical Center (KMC) is one of the leading heart and comprehensive specialty hospitals in Jordan. KMC is the sole private-sector medical institution to be selected by the Royal Commission on Health towards studying and setting the National Agenda, called for by King Abdullah II, to lay the ground for the healthcare industry in Jordan for the next 20 years.

History
Al Khalidi Medical Center was originally established in 1978  by Dr. Ibrahim Al Khalidi as a maternity hospital.

Facilities and departments
Cardiac Unit
Diagnostic and Interventional Radiology
Diagnostic and Therapeutic Oncology
Fertility, Genetics and Reproductive Surgery
Gastroenterology Unit
General Surgery and Specialized Laparoscopy
Histopathology and Cytopathology
Intensive Stroke Unit
Kidney Dialysis Unit
Eye Center
Laboratory
Lithotripsy Unit
Nutritional and Dietary Consultation
Orthopedic and Spine Surgery

References

External links
 

Hospital buildings completed in 1978
Hospitals in Amman